Forbidden City Concert Hall (Chinese: 中山公园音乐堂; literally: "Zhongshan Park Music Hall") is a 1,419-seat multi-purpose venue in Beijing. The name of the venue came from the fact that it is located within the grounds of the Beijing Zhongshan Park, a vast former imperial altar Shejitan and now a public park located to the southwest of the Forbidden City and in the Imperial City.

Aside from its acoustics, the Concert Hall is well known for the romantic setting of its environment, as it is situated inside one of Beijing's most beautiful parks and is surrounded by historic gardens and landmarks.

Notes and references

External links

Official website

Concert halls in China
Opera houses in China
Performing arts venues in Beijing